A Microsoft Reserved Partition (MSR) is a partition of a data storage device, which is created to reserve a portion of disk space for possible subsequent use by a Windows operating system installed on a separate partition. No meaningful data is stored within the MSR; though from the MSR, chunks may be taken for the creation of new partitions, which themselves may contain data structures.

The GUID Partition Table (GPT) label for this partition type is E3C9E316-0B5C-4DB8-817D-F92DF00215AE.

Purpose
Formerly, on disks formatted using the master boot record (MBR) partition layout, certain software components used hidden sectors of the disk for data storage purposes. For example, the Logical Disk Manager (LDM), on dynamic disks, stores metadata in a 1 MB area at the end of the disk which is not allocated to any partition.

The UEFI specification does not allow hidden sectors on GPT-formatted disks. Microsoft reserves a chunk of disk space using this MSR partition type, to provide an alternative data storage space for such software components which previously may have used hidden sectors on MBR formatted disks. Small software-component-specific partitions can be allocated from a portion of the space reserved in the MSR partition.

Size
Beginning in Windows 10, the minimum size of the MSR is 16 MB which the installer allocates by default.

Location
The MSR should be located after the EFI System Partition (ESP) and any OEM service partitions, but it must be located before any primary partitions of bootable Windows operating systems. Microsoft expects an MSR to be present on every GPT disk, and recommends it to be created as the disk is initially partitioned.

See also
 Basic data partition (BDP)
 EFI System Partition (ESP)

References

Disk partitions
Windows NT architecture